Eberle is a Southern German diminutive form of the surname Eber. Notable people with the surname include:

Abastenia St. Leger Eberle (1878–1942), American sculptor
Adam Eberle (1804–1832), German painter
Adolf Eberle (1843–1914), German painter
Benjamin Eberle (born 1963), Liechtensteiner cross-country skier
Chantelle Eberle (born 1981), Canadian curler
Dan Eberle (born 1974), American actor and director
Derek Eberle (born 1972), Canadian ice hockey player
Dietmar Eberle (born 1952), Austrian architect
Dominik Eberle (born 1996), German American football player
Edward Walter Eberle (1864–1929), US Admiral
Emilia Eberle (born 1964), Romanian athlete
Eugene A. Eberle (1840–1917), American actor
Ewald Eberle (born 1933), Liechtensteiner alpine skier
Fabian Eberle (born 1992),  Liechtensteiner football player
Hans Eberle, German canoe racer
Hans Eberle (1925–1988), German football player
Henrik Eberle (born 1970), German historian
Ingrid Eberle (born 1957), Austrian alpine skier
James Eberle (1927–2018), British Royal Navy admiral
Jan Eberle (born 1989), Czech ice hockey player
Jane Eberle, American politician
Jordan Eberle (born 1990), Canadian ice hockey player
Jörg Eberle (born 1962), Swiss ice hockey player
Josef Eberle (1901–?), Czech long-distance runner
Lucas Eberle (born 1990), Liechtensteiner football player
Marc Eberle (born 1980), German football player
Markus Eberle (born 1969), German alpine skier
Paul Eberle, American author
Ray Eberle (1919–1979), American singer
Robert Eberle (1815–1859), German painter
Shirley Eberle, American author
Syrius Eberle (1844–1903), German sculptor and painter
Tod Eberle (1886–1967), American football coach
Tomaso Eberle (born 1725) Austrian born Italian based Luthier
Veronika Eberle (born 1988), German violinist
Vreni Eberle (born 1950), German swimmer
William D. Eberle (1923–2008), American businessman and politician
Wolrad Eberle (1908–1949), German athlete

See also 
USS Eberle
Eberly
Eberl
Eber

Surnames of German origin
German-language surnames
Surnames of Liechtenstein origin